Ashley Harrison (born 18 May 1981) is an Australian former professional rugby league footballer who played as a  in the 2000s and 2010s.

He played for the Gold Coast Titans of the NRL. A Queensland State of Origin representative lock forward, he has played club football previously for the Brisbane Broncos (with whom he won the 2000 NRL Premiership), the Sydney Roosters and the South Sydney Rabbitohs.

Background
Harrison was born in Brisbane, Queensland, Australia.

Playing career

Early career
Harrison attended Wavell State High School in Brisbane, Queensland, and played junior football for Brisbane Brothers and Norths Aspley.

He represented the Australian Schoolboys team in 1998.

Brisbane Broncos
Harrison made his debut in the National Rugby League for the Brisbane Broncos against the New Zealand Warriors on 20 February 2000 (Round 3). He played from the interchange bench for the Broncos in their 2000 NRL grand final victory over the Sydney Roosters.

Having won the 2000 NRL Premiership, the Broncos traveled to England to play against 2000's Super League V Champions, St Helens R.F.C. for the 2001 World Club Challenge, with Harrison playing from the interchange bench in Brisbane's loss.

South Sydney Rabbitohs
After moving to the South Sydney Rabbitohs, he was named the club's player of the year, winning the George Piggins Medal in 2004, and serving as the club's captain for a brief period in 2005.

Harrison was selected to play for Queensland in Game III, 2005, becoming South Sydney's first Queensland Origin representative in many years.

Harrison's elevation to the Souths captaincy in 2005 proved to be a turning point in both the club's 2005 season and his career, as the team won six of their final eight matches under his captaincy to avoid the wooden spoon (the only losses in that period were against the eventual Grand Finalists, Wests Tigers and North Queensland).

Sydney Roosters
Harrison moved to South Sydney's arch rivals the Sydney Roosters for the 2006 NRL season. He managed 41 out of a possible 48 matches at the Roosters.

Gold Coast Titans
Harrison returned to Queensland to play for the Gold Coast Titans from 2008. At the Titans, he started at lock and performed well covering five-eighth also while Matthew Rogers was out on suspension.

As a result, he was named 18th man for the 2008 State of Origin series for Queensland. He started in both the second and third State of Origin games. Harrison was picked ahead of his club captain Scott Prince (who was only drafted into the squad after a knee injury sustained by Darren Lockyer) to play in the second State of Origin on 11 June 2008.

In April 2009, he was named in the preliminary 25-man squad to represent Queensland in the opening State of Origin match for 2009.

In the 2009 NRL season, Harrison was part of the first Gold Coast team to reach the finals.  Harrison played in both finals matches against the Brisbane Broncos and Parramatta.  The following year, Harrison was a member of the Gold Coast side which enjoyed their best season on the field as they eventually reached the preliminary final before being defeated by Harrison's old club the Sydney Roosters.  In the 2011 NRL season, Harrison was limited to only 13 games as the Gold Coast finished last on the table and claimed the wooden spoon.

Harrison was only selected for Game I of the 2013 State of Origin series in which Queensland extended their record for consecutive series victories to eight.

On 27 June 2014, he confirmed his retirement earlier than he wanted due to a neck injury.

Footnotes

External links 

NRL profile

1981 births
Living people
Australian rugby league players
Brisbane Broncos players
Gold Coast Titans players
Queensland Rugby League State of Origin players
NRL All Stars players
Prime Minister's XIII players
Rugby league locks
Rugby league five-eighths
Rugby league players from Brisbane
South Sydney Rabbitohs players
South Sydney Rabbitohs captains
Sportsmen from Queensland
Sydney Roosters players